Secret Well is a 2007 Cambodian horror film. The film provides a horror style similar to 2002's The Ring.

Plot
A family moves into an old villa that belonged to their relative for a hundred years. But when they find a strange well behind their house, something strange begins to happen, with mysterious deaths in the family, until they unlock a secret, buried in the well, about a young girl who was killed and her body buried behind the house. Now she has come back for her revenge against someone in the family who kept it secret, so that their deaths will keep it secret too.

External links
well DVD Cover

2007 films
Khmer-language films
2007 horror films
Cambodian horror films